Rudbar-e Qasran District is in Shemiranat County, Tehran province, Iran. At the 2006 National Census, its population was 15,489 in 4,563 households. The following census in 2011 counted 18,685 people in 6,038 households. At the latest census in 2016, the district had 17,419 inhabitants in 5,969 households.

References 

Shemiranat County

Districts of Tehran Province

Populated places in Tehran Province

Populated places in Shemiranat County